The 1990 Jacksonville State Gamecocks football team represented Jacksonville State University as a member of the Gulf South Conference (GSC) during the 1990 NCAA Division II football season. Led by sixth-year head coach Bill Burgess, the Gamecocks compiled an overall record of 9–3 with a mark of 6–2 in conference play, and finished second in the GSC.

Schedule

References

Jacksonville State
Jacksonville State Gamecocks football seasons
Jacksonville State Gamecocks football